The Clemville Formation is a geologic formation in Quebec. It preserves fossils dating back to the Silurian period.

See also

 List of fossiliferous stratigraphic units in Quebec

References
 

Silurian Quebec
Silurian southern paleotropical deposits